Niphona lateralis is a species of beetle in the family Cerambycidae. It was described by White in 1858. It is known from Thailand, Borneo, Cambodia and Malaysia.

References

lateralis
Beetles described in 1858